The Adelaide International Raceway (also known as Adelaide International or  AIR) is a permanent circuit owned by Australian Motorsport Club Limited under the auspices of the Bob Jane Corporation. AIR is owned by the Bob Jane Corporation and run by the Australian Motorsport Club Ltd.

History

Adelaide International Raceway (AIR) was built by Surfers Paradise businessman Keith Williams in 1972. Williams also owned the Mallala Race Circuit and Surfers Paradise International Raceway. Williams owned the track, which remained in an almost 'raw state' until purchased in 1982 by the Bob Jane Corporation.

The race track can be used in four different configurations. As it is a drag strip, the front straight of the circuit is wider than the rest of the track. Like most Australian circuits at its time of construction, AIR raced and still races clockwise, though the Super Bowl, with speedway meetings and NASCAR races in the 1990s, is the only part of the circuit to run state or national championship races anti-clockwise.

Both the Speedway Super Bowl (more commonly referred to as "The Bowl"), and the Drag Strip have the capacity to run night meetings due to the lights that run around the Super Bowl and down the circuits main straight. The spectator viewing areas extend from the final turn and all the way down the main straight. There are also spectator mounds from turn 3 around to turn 6, and then from the outside of turn 7 (the bowl) and all along the back straight. The proximity of the final turn of the bowl to Port Wakefield Road means that spectator mounds can not be placed there.

Starting in 1994 with the removal of the old stands along the main straight and replacing them with spectator mounds, upgrades have been made through the years in a bid to bring AIR back to being a regularly used national motor racing venue. The old timing tower and VIP facilities were pulled down and replaced with several new buildings and a paved VIP area for corporate sponsors was added. A spectator mound and a small, uncovered grandstand, located on the infield of the Super Bowl directly behind pit lane, have also been added in recent years.

Adelaide International Raceway also raced top level motorbike racing. Series that utilised the circuit included the Swann International Series featuring riders such as Graeme Crosby, who won the 1980 series race, and Gregg Hansford. There was an annual 3-Hour race held at the circuit until the mid-1980s that was televised nationally on the ABC, but once the covenant was lifted on the Mallala Raceway, safety concerns about the Super Bowl having no runoff area on the outside of the track saw bike racing move to Mallala instead. AIR continues to run bikes in drag racing with Top Bike and Pro Stock Motorcycle both being regulars at drag racing events.

Circuit Racing
From 1972 to 1988 the Adelaide International Raceway was South Australia's major motor racing circuit, due to a covenant placed on Mallala preventing any motor sport activities there (the covenant had been done away with by 1982). AIR regularly hosted rounds of the Australian Touring Car Championship and endurance races of the Australian Manufacturers' Championship (later known as the 'Championship of Makes'). The Adelaide track also hosted rounds of the famous Tasman Series, the Rothmans International Series, as well as other CAMS sanctioned national championships, including the Australian Drivers' Championship, Australian Formula 2 Championship, the Australian Sports Car Championship, Australian Sports Sedan Championship, and the Australian GT Championship.

This was due to the longer periods of high speed cornering with the cars and suspensions loaded to the outside. For the longer national championship races, such as the 40 or 60 lap ATCC races and the end of year 125 lap touring car endurance race, this made tyre choice and suspension settings a critical part of success at AIR. Dick Johnson noted during practice for AIR's 1988 ATCC round that after the 60 lap race even the lighter and significantly slower Gemini's would be suffering with worn tyres.

AIR also has an unusual set up for the Pits. While the pit lane is located on the inside of the track coming onto the main straight (cars enter pit lane at the end of the Super Bowl's back straight), the cars actually enter the track from the paddock through the pit gate on the outside of the track at the end of turn 9 (the gate is closed and forms part of the outside retaining wall during races). This means that the main paddock for AIR is located on the outside of the main straight behind the officials tower and spectator mounds. This is despite there being an open and unused area of approximately 21,500m2 located within the Super Bowl behind pit lane.

The outright lap record for the full  circuit is held by Australia's  Formula One World Drivers' Champion Alan Jones at 49.5 seconds. Jones set the record during the 1977 Rothmans International Series driving a Lola T332-Chevrolet Formula 5000. Jones also holds the GT lap record of the circuit with a time of 51.7 seconds while driving a Porsche 935 in the 1982 Australian GT Championship. Circuit owner Bob Jane also holds an AIR track record, co-holding the Sports Sedan lap record with former local driver John Briggs with a time of 54.1 seconds set in 1981. Both drivers set the time in the same race on the same day, with both driving a Chevrolet Monza. Jane's DeKon Monza was built and prepared by Norm Beechey's former mechanic Pat Purcell while the Briggs Monza was built by Adelaide-based K&A Engineering.

To set his lap time, Monterosso drove the Adelaide built (by K&A Engineering) Group A, Group C and IMSA specification Veskanda Chevrolet sports car used by John Bowe to dominate the 1986 Australian Sports Car Championship. The Veskanda is generally regarded as Australia's fastest ever race car.

Speedway Super Bowl
In the early 1970s, and following the American NASCAR influence which at the time was drawing record crowds, paved short track speedway was becoming popular in Australia (for many years dirt track speedway already had a big following) and with the Speedway Super Bowl, Adelaide a ready made track. The turns of the bowl being banked made turn 7 of the full circuit (turn 5 on the short course) slightly off-camber as cars entered the Bowl.

The Speedway Super Bowl held winter race meetings and was first used on 16 June 1974 when a large crowd or around 10,000 turned up to see competitors from Rowley Park Speedway drive on the new asphalt speedway. Sedan driver Jim Curnow was knocked unconscious when his Holden Torana hit the concrete retaining wall and chronic Understeer was the biggest complaint of almost all drivers with cars generally being set up for dirt and not asphalt. Some sedan drivers then started building cars that were suited to racing on the Super Bowl with a space frame chassis, well tuned V8 engines and wide slick tyres (such as those which were racing successfully at Liverpool) and these cars quickly dominated. The problem was that there were too few of them with some races only having five or six competitors. Most drivers eventually decided it was more fun racing on the dirt at Rowley Park and with crowd numbers dwindling to around 2,000 due to both the tracks location ( north of Adelaide) and the dwindling number of competitors, speedway meetings stopped being held after 1976. Speedway Super Sedans did return to AIR in the late 1980s for some daytime meetings, however crowds were down.

In an ironic twist, when Rowley Park ceased operating in April 1979, Adelaide's new speedway venue Speedway Park (now called Speedway City), was opened adjacent to AIR in October 1979, the crowds returned despite the same travel time to get there as for AIR.

From 1990, the Super Bowl became a regular and popular short track venue for AUSCAR and NASCAR racing during the 1990s, with crowds of up to 15,000 attending the annual Adelaide round of the Australian Championships. The Super Bowl was, and still is the only race circuit still in operation in Australia other than the Calder Park Thunderdome where the race cars can run on a paved oval track, with both tracks currently owned the Bob Jane Corporation. The outright lap record for the Super Bowl of 22.7012 was set in a NSACAR by Terry Whyhoon driving a Ford Thunderbird during the 1997/98 Goodyear Australian SuperSpeedway Series.

The fastest qualifying and race laps set during speedway meetings was set in 1976 by John Hughes (later the founder of World Series Sprintcars) driving a V8 powered HJ Holden One Tonner ute chassis covered by HJ Monaro bodywork. His times were 23.8 for qualifying and 23.2 seconds race lap, which were not much slower than the more powerful (with 20+ years of engine, tyre and suspension development) NASCAR and AUSCAR times set during the late 1990s. Indeed, Hughes' qualifying time of 23.8 in 1976 would have placed him 8th on the NASCAR starting grid for the SuperSpeedway Series meeting some 22 years later (the two categories both raced anti-clockwise).

Drag Racing

AIR played host to numerous national drag racing championships through the years, as well as regular off-street racing for road cars. The track then went unused and had seen no drag racing since the late 1990s, with racing making a return in November 2011. This saw Top Doorslammers run the 1/8th mile track for the first time in over 10 years and gives hope for drag racing's future in South Australia.

On 13–15 April 2012 top line drag racing made its return to AIR for the first ANDRA meeting at the track for over 10 years with he ANDRA Pro Series 1000, which marked the Australian debut (albeit for all classes, not just the nitromethane categories) of  drag racing. ANDRA Top Fuel will continue to compete over a quarter-mile (402m) distance, but short tracks such as Adelaide will only be to 1,000 feet.

In 2021, Australian National Drag Racing Association announced the establishment of an annual Australian Drag Racing Championship series, with ASID as one of five venues across the country to host a round in the inaugural season.

Test Track
Since its opening in 1972, Adelaide International has been used as a test track for various race teams including the Melbourne-based Holden Dealer Team, as well as Adelaide based manufacturer Holden. Also, due to it being closer to Adelaide than Mallala, AIR is also used by the South Australian Police for driver training and car compliance testing.

During the years that the Formula One World Championship held the Australian Grand Prix on the Adelaide Street Circuit (1985–1995), AIR was used for driver training for the annual Celebrity Race held as a support event for the Grand Prix. In the early years of the Adelaide AGP, AIR was also used by some Formula One teams as a shakedown circuit, though this only lasted until 1986.

Recent Use
The entire track was resurfaced in early 2008, restricting use even further with a possibility of events being held from later in the year.

In the Jan/Feb 2012 edition of Australian Muscle Car Magazine it was reported that Keith Williams, the founder and original owner of the Adelaide International Raceway, had died at the age of 82.

AIR is currently used for Drifting, with the G1 Drift Competition and Drift Supercup holding events at the circuit.

Australian Touring Car Championship round winners
Note: In both the 1976 and 1977 Australian Touring Car Championships there were two rounds held at Adelaide International Raceway. The earlier round was a 'sprint' event and later round was a 250 km endurance race.

The last Group C ATCC round winner at AIR was Allan Grice driving a VH Commodore SS on 1 July 1984, this was also the last ATCC race held under the locally developed Group C rules. During the race Peter Brock (who finished second) set the outright touring car lap record. The last ATCC race held at AIR was on 1 May 1988 with Dick Johnson winning the treble. He qualified his Shell sponsored Ford Sierra RS500 on pole, claimed the fastest lap of the race (the Group A lap record), and won from his teammate John Bowe.

Races listed in Italics denote that season's ATCC endurance race.

Adelaide 250/300
The AIR endurance race was first run in 1972 as a 250-mile race (397 km) before being shortened to 300 km (187.5 mi) in 1978 and became part of the "Australian Championship of Makes" until 1980 then becoming part of the Australian Endurance Championship. The first endurance race, the Chesterfield 250, run on 27 August 1972 for Series Production Touring Cars, was won by Colin Bond driving a Holden Dealer Team (HDT) LJ Torana GTR XU-1. The last enduro, the Humes Guardrail 300, run on 20 November 1983 under CAMS Group C regulations, was won by Peter Brock in his HDT VH Commodore SS.

The 1976 and 1977 races were run as part of the Australian Touring Car Championship.

National Championship Rounds

Australian Drivers' Championship
Adelaide International played host to seven rounds of the Australian Drivers' Championship between 1972 and 1988. From 1989 the Drivers' Championship (also known as the CAMS Gold Star) moved to Mallala.

Australian Sports Sedan / GT Championship
AIR played host to a round of the Australian Sports Sedan Championship on 6 occasions between 1976 and 1981. The ASSC was then changed to the Australian GT Championship in 1982 with AIR hosting a round each year until the demise of the AGTC in 1985.

Australian Sports Car Championship
AIR played host to a round of the Australian Sports Car Championship on 9 occasions between 1972 and 1988.

Australian Formula 2 Championship
Adelaide International played host to eleven rounds of the Australian Formula 2 Championship between 1972 and 1988.

* 1988 was a round of the Australian Drivers' Championship

Tasman Series
Adelaide International played host to four rounds of the Tasman Series between 1972 and 1975.

Rothmans International Series
Adelaide International played host to four rounds of the Rothmans International Series between 1976 and 1979.

Lap records
As of April 2015. Unless otherwise stated all records are for the long (2.410 km) circuit. The official race lap records at Adelaide International Raceway are listed as:

References

External links

Circuit map
Circuit info from motorsportworld.com.au
Adelaide International Raceway in Google Maps

Motorsport venues in South Australia
Former Supercars Championship circuits
Drag racing venues in Australasia
Sports venues in Adelaide
Motorsport in Adelaide
Speedway venues in Australia